Post Grad is a 2009 American romantic comedy film directed by Vicky Jenson and starring Alexis Bledel, about a recent college graduate who moves back in with her family while she figures out what she wants to do next.

Originally under the working titles of Ticket to Ride and then The Post-Grad Survival Guide, the film was released on August 21, 2009.

Plot
Ryden Malby (Bledel) graduates from college in the middle of the late-2000s recession and is forced to move back in with her parents, because her dream job has been given to her arrogant college bestie Jessica Bard (Catherine Reitman). Ryden and her best friend Adam (Zach Gilford), who has had a longtime crush on her, must find a job for Ryden before she loses hope for her future dream as an editor of a big publishing company, but her ambitions for getting a job blinded her from noticing that Adam was giving up going to New York in hopes that one day she will feel about him the same way he does for her. After a while, Adam gives up and goes to Columbia and Ryden gets her dream job, but realizes she isn't really happy and quits her job to go and live with Adam. They end up dating and having kids together

Cast
 Alexis Bledel as Ryden Malby
 Zach Gilford as Adam Davies
 Michael Keaton as Walter Malby
 Jane Lynch as Carmella Malby
 Carol Burnett as Maureen Malby
 Bobby Coleman as Hunter Malby
 Rodrigo Santoro as David Santiago
 Catherine Reitman as Jessica Bard
 Craig Robinson as Funeral director
 J. K. Simmons as Roy Davies
 Mary Anne McGarry as Barbara Snaff
 Vanessa Branch as Receptionist
 Fred Armisen as Guacanator pitchman
 Alexandra Holden as Cute funky girl
 Andy Daly as Lloyd Hastings
 Desean Terry as Young Cop
 Angel Oquendo as Police Officer
 Walter Emanuel Jones as Voice Cast
 Demetri Martin (uncredited) as TV commercial producer

Production
Amanda Bynes was originally set to star, but dropped and was replaced by Alexis Bledel.

Reception
Post Grad was panned by film critics. On Rotten Tomatoes the film has an approval rating of 8% based on 100 reviews. The site's consensus states: "A lightweight, unambitious comedy, Post Grad features fine actors that can do little with its middling, uninspiring script." On Metacritic it has a score of 35 out of 100, based on 25 reviews, indicating "generally unfavorable reviews". Audiences surveyed by CinemaScore gave the film a grade B on scale of A to F.

Peter Debruge of Variety magazine wrote: "As fiction characters go, Ryden seems as dull as they come, making it hard to muster much sympathy for her plight".

Roger Ebert gave the film three out of four stars, stating, "If you're cynical or jaded, it might not get past you. But here is the first movie in a long time that had me actually admitting I wouldn't mind seeing a sequel."

Box office
During opening weekend, the film opened at #11, grossing $2,651,996.

Home media
The film was released on DVD and Blu-Ray on November 24, 2009.

References

External links
 
 
 
 
 

2009 films
2009 independent films
2009 romantic comedy films
American independent films
American romantic comedy films
Films about families
Films directed by Vicky Jenson
Films produced by Ivan Reitman
Films shot in California
Films shot in Los Angeles
20th Century Fox films
The Montecito Picture Company films
Films scored by Christophe Beck
Dune Entertainment films
Films with screenplays by Kelly Fremon Craig
2000s English-language films
2000s American films